"Liberi o no" is a song performed by Italian singer and pianist Raphael Gualazzi and The Bloody Beetroots. The song was released in Italy as a digital download on 20 February 2014 as the lead single from his second extended play Accidentally on Purpose - Sanremo's Festival 2014. The song peaked at number 20 on the Italian Singles Chart. The song was written and produced by Sir Bob Cornelius Rifo and Raphael Gualazzi.

Music video
A music video to accompany the release of "Liberi o no" was first released onto YouTube on 18 February 2014 at a total length of three minutes and thirty-three seconds.

Track listing

Charts

Weekly charts

Release history

References

2014 songs
2014 singles
Songs written by Raphael Gualazzi
Sanremo Music Festival songs
Sugar Music singles